Julie Nistad Samsonsen (born 5 April 2000) is a Norwegian speed skater. She competed at the 2022 Winter Olympics, in Women's 500 metres,

She competed at the 2019 World Junior Speed Skating Championships,  2021 European Speed Skating Championships, 2022 European Speed Skating Championships, and 2021–22 ISU Speed Skating World Cup.

References

External links

2000 births
Living people
Sportspeople from Bergen
Norwegian female speed skaters
Olympic speed skaters of Norway
Speed skaters at the 2022 Winter Olympics
World Sprint Speed Skating Championships medalists
21st-century Norwegian women